The silver marsupial frog (Gastrotheca plumbea) is a species of frog in the family Hemiphractidae. It is endemic to the Pacific slopes of Andes in northern and central Ecuador.
It is a nocturnal, arboreal inhabitant of cloud forests that can also be found in forest edge and secondary, degraded habitats. It is closely associated with arboreal bromeliads. It is threatened by habitat loss.

References

External links

ARKive: Silver marsupial frog  (Gastrotheca plumbea)
Breathing Space: Gastrotheca plumbea

Gastrotheca
Amphibians of Ecuador
Amphibians of the Andes
Endemic fauna of Ecuador
Taxonomy articles created by Polbot
Amphibians described in 1882